Robert Ryan (1909–1973) was an American actor.

Robert Ryan may also refer to:

 Robert Ryan (Canadian politician) (1878–1954), Liberal Member of the Canadian House of Commons
 Robert Ryan (Irish politician) (1882–1952), Irish Fianna Fáil politician
 Robert Ryan (writer) (born c. 1963), English author, journalist and screenwriter
 Rob Ryan (born 1962), American football coach
 Rob Ryan (artist) (born 1962), British visual artist
 Rob Ryan (baseball) (born 1973), former baseball outfielder
 Rob Ryan (businessman), co-owner of the Las Vegas Locomotives
 Rob Ryan (entrepreneur) (born 1948), founder of Ascend Communications and Entrepreneur America
 B. J. Ryan (Robert Victor Ryan Jr., born 1975), American baseball coach and pitcher

See also
 Bob Ryan (disambiguation)
 Bobby Ryan (disambiguation)
 Robbie Ryan (disambiguation)